GTV, also known as Gazi Television, is a Bangladeshi Bengali-language satellite and cable television channel owned by Gazi Group Commencing broadcasts on 12 June 2012, it is based in Segun Bagicha in Dhaka.

History 
GTV received its license to broadcast from the Bangladesh Telecommunication Regulatory Commission, along with several other privately owned Bangladeshi television channels, on 20 October 2009.  It officially began broadcasting on 12 June 2012. Coinciding its third anniversary in June 2015, GTV adopted a new logo and slogan, "Ja Dekhte Chan, Paben" (যা দেখতে চান, পাবেন). Along with Bangladesh Television and Maasranga Television, GTV broadcast the 2016 Asia Cup for Bangladeshi audiences.

Programming
The channel offers a variety of programming including news, movies, dramas, talk shows, sports, and more. In 2016 it also bought broadcasting rights of BPL from BCB. This station is owned by Gazi Group which is owned by Golam Dastagir Gazi, a current minister and a member of the ruling Bangladesh Awami League party.

List of programming 
 Alif Laila
 Bagha-Sher
 Bangladesh Premier League
 Jononi
 Kung Fu Panda: Legends of Awesomeness
 Mayajal
 Shilpo Bari
 Shodh
 Super Girls
 Teenage Mutant Ninja Turtles

Sport Broadcasting Rights

 BPL

See also
 List of television stations in Bangladesh

References

External links 
 

Television channels in Bangladesh
Mass media in Dhaka
Television channels and stations established in 2012
2013 establishments in Bangladesh